Yvan Decock (born 1 July 1941) is a Belgian sprint canoer who competed in the early 1960s. At the 1960 Summer Olympics in Rome, he was eliminated in the repechages of the K-1 4 × 500 m event.

References
Sports-reference.com profile

1941 births
Belgian male canoeists
Canoeists at the 1960 Summer Olympics
Living people
Olympic canoeists of Belgium
20th-century Belgian people